Kušići is a village located in the municipality of Ivanjica, southwestern Serbia. According to the 2011 census, the village has a population of 498 inhabitants.

Notes
 The nearby Kušića ditches are a memorial to the Serbo-Turkish and Balkan wars. There is also a statue to Major Ilic here.
 The village contains a church, a hotel, a post office, three shops and three pubs.

References

Populated places in Moravica District